Vice Admiral Jocelyn Stuart Cambridge Salter DSO & Bar OBE (24 November 1901 – 27 May 1989) was a Royal Navy officer who became Flag Officer, Malta.

Naval career
Salter joined the Royal Navy in 1915 and served in the First World War. He also served in the Second World War becoming commanding officer of the destroyer HMS Duncan in January 1940, commanding officer of the destroyer HMS Foresight in January 1941 and deputy director of Training and Staff Duties at the Admiralty in August 1942. He went on to be commanding officer of the destroyer HMS Mackay in June 1944 and commanding officer of the destroyer HMS Eglington in November 1944.

After the War Salter became commanding officer of the RN Air Station at Sembawang in December 1945, Captain of HMNB Rosyth in March 1948 and commanding officer of the cruiser HMS Jamaica in March 1950. After that he became Flag Officer, Malta in September 1952 and Admiral Superintendent, HMNB Portsmouth in October 1954.

References

1901 births
1989 deaths
Companions of the Distinguished Service Order
Officers of the Order of the British Empire